Alexander Wilson Hogg (9 February 1841 – 17 November 1920) was a member of parliament for Masterton, in the North Island of New Zealand.

Member of Parliament

From 1904 until 1905 he was the Liberal Party's junior whip.

New Liberal Party

Hogg was associated with the New Liberal Party in 1905. Like most of the other New Liberals, Hogg wanted the establishment of a State bank, but he did not share their zeal for constitutional innovations, rejecting the idea of the referendum and claiming that the Elective Executive Bill should be put in the rubbish bin.

Hogg was made Minister of Labour, Customs, and Roads and Bridges in 1909. But he resigned from his portfolios in the same year because of general dissatisfaction with the Ward Government's policies.

Alexander Hogg sought election in 1911 as an Independent Labour candidate, and in 1912 became a member of the first New Zealand Labour Party. However, in the 1914 contest he stood as a Liberal in Masterton.

He was a newspaper editor/owner of the Wairarapa Star.

Quotes 
Alexander Hogg on politics in 1882:

Our system of general government is imperfect. The framework is already eroded and moth-eaten, loaded with parasites, suffering from a species of dry rot

References

Further reading

Works by Hogg

 
 This is a collection of forty volumes of clippings (with tables of contents) from Wairarapa newspapers (and Wellington's "Dominion"). This collection is also available on microfiche.
 
 This is a collection of clippings from Wairarapa newspapers (and Wellington's "Dominion").

Works about Hogg

 
 This volume contains a biography of Hogg.

External links 
 

1841 births
1920 deaths
Independent MPs of New Zealand
New Zealand Liberal Party MPs
Members of the Cabinet of New Zealand
Local politicians in New Zealand
New Zealand journalists
New Zealand educators
Scottish emigrants to New Zealand
Politicians from Glasgow
People from Masterton
New Liberal Party (New Zealand) MPs
Unsuccessful candidates in the 1887 New Zealand general election
Unsuccessful candidates in the 1911 New Zealand general election
Unsuccessful candidates in the 1914 New Zealand general election
Members of the New Zealand House of Representatives
New Zealand MPs for North Island electorates
19th-century New Zealand politicians